Usagi Yojimbo Book 29: Two Hundred Jizo is the twenty-ninth graphic novel in the ongoing Usagi Yojimbo series created by cartoonist Stan Sakai. It was published by Dark Horse Comics in 2015, collecting stories previously published in Usagi Yojimbo (vol. 3) #139 – 144 and stories from Dark Horse Presents (vol. 2).

The foreword for this book reprints the following short stories created by Stan Sakai.

 Stan Talks to Usagi (initially published on the Dark Horse Comics web-site in February 2011)
 Stan Interviews Usagi Part Two (initially published in Usagi Yojimbo Sketchbook #9, dated 2012)

The story Sukanku was initially published in Usagi Yojimbo Sketchbook #3, dated 2016

Two Hundred Jizo was published in trade paperback and limited edition hardcover (limited to 900 signed and numbered copies).

Publication Details

Trade Paperback Edition 

Publisher: Dark Horse Comics 
Publication Date: June 17, 2015 
Format: b&w, 208 pages; TPB, 6 x 9 
Price: $17.99

Signed & Numbered Limited Hardcover Edition 

Publisher: Dark Horse Comics 
Publication Date: July 1, 2015 
Format: b&w, 208 pages; Ltd. HC, 6 x 9 
Price: $59.99

Table of Contents 

 Introduction by Guy Davis
 Foreword 
 The Artist
 Buntori
 Murder at the Inn
 Two Hundred Jizo
 Ice Runners
 Shoyu
 Afterword
 Sukanku
 Story Notes
 Cover Gallery
 Author Bio

Foreign Language Editions 

No foreign language editions of this book have been published yet.

Usagi Yojimbo